Alice in the Navy is a 1961 Greek comedy film directed by Alekos Sakellarios.

Cast 
 Aliki Vougiouklaki - Alice
 Dimitris Papamichael - Kostas Degleris
 Giannis Gionakis - cadet
 Giannis Malouhos - Alkis Vranas
 Kaiti Lambropoulou - Sofia
 Despo Diamantidou - Alice's mother
 Kostas Papachristos - officer
 Lambros Konstantaras - commander
 Kostas Voutsas - cadet
 Stavros Paravas - cadet
 Giorgos Tsitsopoulos - Takis Dimitriou
 Dinos Karyris - Nikolaos Apostolou
 Margarita Athanasiou - Eirini

Production 
It was filmed aboard the ship Aetos D01, part of the "Wild Beasts" flotilla of the Greek Navy. Aetos was constructed during World War 2 for the United States Navy, serving as  USS Slater DE-766, before being transferred to Greek service as part of the Truman Doctrine in 1951. After decommissioning from Greek service in 1991, Aetos was returned to the United States and restored. She now operates as the USS Slater Destroyer Escort Historical Museum in Albany, NY, and she is the last destroyer escort afloat in America.

References

External links 

1961 comedy films
1961 films
Greek comedy films
Films set in Greece
Military humor in film
Films scored by Manos Hatzidakis
1960s Greek-language films